Kökçü is a surname. Notable people with the surname include:
 Orkun Kökçü, football player
 Ozan Kökçü, football player

Surnames